Adam L. Penenberg (born July 27, 1962) is an American journalist and educator. He is the editor of PandoDaily and previously wrote for Forbes, Fast Company, The New York Times, Wired News, and Playboy. Penenberg is also an associate professor of journalism at New York University. With Forbes, Penenberg gained national attention in 1998 for helping reveal The New Republic reporter Stephen Glass had been fabricating his stories.

Education
Penenberg received his B.A. in Economics from Reed College.

Career

Stephen Glass scandal
In the summer of 1998, Penenberg, then a reporter with Forbes magazine's online arm, Forbes Digital Tool, came upon a story in The New Republic about a Silicon Valley firm which was hacked by a teenager, then hired the hacker as a security consultant. Amazed that The New Republic had somehow managed to scoop Forbes, Penenberg tried to verify it. Penenberg could not find any evidence that the company, Jukt Micronics, even existed. He also could not verify any of the events that Glass claimed resulted from the hacker's hiring, such as a radio spot from concerned Nevada state officials or several joint state efforts to combat hacking. After an internal investigation, The New Republic determined that Glass had fabricated the story and subsequently fired him.

Other activities
, Penenberg is an assistant professor of journalism at New York University. He is also a freelance writer for Fast Company, The New York Times, Forbes, Wired News, and Playboy. His non-fiction book Tragic Indifference: One Man's Battle With the Auto Industry Over the Dangers of SUVs, which deals with the biggest product liability case in history, the Ford and Firestone controversy, was published in 2003 and is currently being made into a movie.

In 2009, Penenberg authored the book Viral Loop: From Facebook to Twitter, How Today's Smartest Businesses Grow Themselves. Viral Loop explains how companies such as Netscape, eBay, PayPal, Skype, Hotmail, Facebook, and Twitter implemented viral loops to grow exponentially and achieve billion-dollar valuations in only a short amount of time. The book is divided into three sections including viral businesses, marketing, and networks.

In popular culture
Penenberg was portrayed by Steve Zahn in the movie Shattered Glass.

References

External links
Adam Penenberg's Official Website
Adam Penenberg's famous Forbes' online article, Lies, damn lies and fiction which reveals Stephen Glass' fabrication
Penenberg's faculty page

1962 births
Living people
Reed College alumni
American male journalists
20th-century American journalists